is a Japanese gravure model, AV idol and erotic dancer. She began as a gravure idol and later moved to hardcore video work where she became an award-winning AV idol.

Life and career

Gravure idol
Aoki was born in Yamagata Prefecture on February 28, 1985. She was first scouted in Harajuku as a gravure model in 2002 at the age of 17. Her first gravure video, Burst, appeared in 2003 and she soon became a popular gravure idol. After two years as a gravure model, Aoki decided to enter the adult video scene and signed with the major Japanese AV company S1 No. 1 Style, one of the Hokuto Corporation group of companies. It is reported that her contract guaranteed her an estimated 13,000,000 yen (about $166,000) per movie, a sum greatly above the average even for top AV idols.

AV actress
Her first AV production with S1, K-cup Active Idol Risky Mosaic,  appeared in May 2006 and was directed by Hideto Aki who also directed most of her subsequent videos with S1. She says she was comfortable with her first AV work but was embarrassed about showing her nipples because they were small and pale colored. After making ten original videos with S1 in almost a year, she left the studio along with Maria Ozawa and other fellow S1 actresses to join the startup company DAS. In contrast to S1 which specializes in the "softer" type of pornography with mostly straightforward boy-girl sex scenes, DAS videos ventured into more extreme areas such as simulated rape, creampie and watersports. Aoki starred in the first video of the DAS series DASD-001, 20 Shots Creampie!, released on April 25, 2007. She has made several more movies for DAS including her first inter-racial role in the DAS "Black Gang Rape" series.

By August 2008, Aoki was with a new start-up studio, OPPAI, which publicized her first video for them, 108 cm Kcup Rin, with a signing and modeling event. Although continuing to make movies for OPPAI, she has also appeared in videos for Attackers and yet another new studio, Ranmaru.

In the 2010s, Aoki became a prolific freelance actress appearing and performing with many different studios from Venus and Wanz Factory to Madonna. As of 2020 she remains as an active performer and appeared in more than 500 adult films.

Popularity and recognition
Aoki is one of the latest examples of the very popular genre of "Big-Bust" models in the Japanese AV industry going back to Kimiko Matsuzaka. As a measure of her popularity in Japan, the listing of the top 100 actresses by sales from the DMM website shows Aoki ranked #3 in 2006 and #9 in 2007.

Aoki had a small preview appearance in the S1 compilation video Hyper – Barely There Mosaic (ハイパーギリギリモザイク) with AV idols Sora Aoi, Yua Aida, Yuma Asami, Maria Ozawa and Honoka which won the 2006 AV Open competition among Japanese porn studios.

At the 7th annual Takeshi Kitano Entertainment Awards for 2006 sponsored by the Japanese tabloid newspaper Tokyo Sports (東京スポーツ), Aoki was honored with the Star AV Actress Award (主演AV女優賞).

Filmography
{| class="wikitable sortable"
! Release date
! Video title
! Company
! Director
! Notes
|-
| 2003-07-25
| Burst
| VegaVEDV-49
| 
| DebutGravure
|-
| 2003-10-31
| Rin Aoki Blue Beans
| Aqua HouseDAH-38
| 
| Gravure
|-
| 2005-01-20
| Explosion
| E-NetSCID-31
| 
| Gravure
|-
| 2005-03-24
| EIGHT
| Layfull14D
| 
| Gravure
|-
| 2005-07-08
| Rin Aoki Dynamite Channel
| Dynamite ChannelDYNAM-014
| 
| Gravure
|-
| 2005-10-22
| EIGHT - Virtual Sex
| Layfull25D
| 
| Gravure
|-
| 2005-11-22
| EIGHT - Lesbian
| Layfull27D
| 
| Gravure
|-
| 2005-12-22
| EIGHT - Confined
| Layfull28D
| 
| Gravure
|-
| 2006-03-17
| Soul Milk Rin Aoki
| Nippon MediaDCB-60
| 
| Gravure
|-
| 2006-05-07
| K-cup Active Idol Risky Mosaic
| S1ONED-432
| Hideto Aki
| Adult Video Debut
|-
| 2006-06-07
| Six Costumes Pakopako!
| S1ONED-459
| Yukihiko Shimamura
| 
|-
| 2006-07-07
| Super Titty-Fucking 4
| S1ONED-482
| Hideto Aki
| 
|-
| 2006-08-07
| Delusional Special Bath
| S1ONED-506
| Hideto Aki
| 
|-
| 2006-08-07
| Hyper – Barely There Mosaic
| S1ONSD-028
| 
| CompilationWith Sora Aoi, Yua Aida, Maria Ozawa, Yuma Asami & Honoka2006 AV Open winner
|-
| 2006-09-19
| Climax! Too Much Coming Squirting Fuck
| S1ONED-548
| Hideto Aki
| 
|-
| 2006-10-17
| Endless Bakobako 13
| S1ONED-561
| Hideto Aki
| 
|-
| 2006-11-17
| BakoBako Gangbang 19
| S1ONED-612
| Hideto Aki
| 
|-
| 2006-12-19
| The Big Tits Nursery Just for Me
| S1ONED-635
| Hideto Aki
| 
|-
| 2007-01-07
| Sex on the Beach, Southern Island Pakopako!
| S1ONED-652
| Hideto Aki
| 
|-
| 2007-02-07
| Hyper-Risky Mosaic
| S1ONED-676
| Hideto Aki
| 
|-
| 2007-04-25
| 20 Shots Creampie!
| DASDASD-001
| Hokusai
| 
|-
| 2007-05-13
| Genuine Bukkake
| MoodyzMIGD-006
| Alala Kurosawa
| 
|-
| 2007-06-25
| Big Breast Cattle
| DASDASD-009
| Hideto Aki
| 
|-
| 2007-07-25
| K-Cup Gravure Idol Nakadashi Rape
| DASDASD-015
| 
| 
|-
| 2007-08-07
| Raped in Husband's Presence
| Attackers SharkSHKD-302
| Kenzo Nagira
| 
|-
| 2007-08-25
| Fainting Orgasm Endless Squirting
| DASDASD-020
| Ekimoto
| 
|-
| 2007-09-07
| Rin Aoki SM Live Show
| AttackersSSPD-040
| Kenji Hayami
| 
|-
| 2007-10-01
| Genuine Nakadashi
| MoodyzMIGD-059
| Hiroa
| 
|-
| 2007-11-01
| Nakadashi Tonic, Erotic Toy 14
| MoodyzMIGD-070
| Fubuki Sakura
| 
|-
| 2007-12-07
| Female Ninja Torture Rape 3 (also known as Princess Insult 3)
| AttackersAVGL-002
| Katsuyuki Hasegawa
| With Megu Ayase & Rin HayakawaEntry in 2008 AV Grand Prix contest
|-
| 2008-01-25
| Rin Aoki - Fallen Urine-Drinking Pig Idol
| DASDASD-042
| 
| 
|-
| 2008-02-13
| Hyper Digital Mosaic　Creampie Orgy 4 Hours
| Moodyz BestMIBD-254
| 
| Compilation with Rina Wakamiya, Sakurako, Reika, RiRi, Risako Konno, Chihiro Hara, Serina Hayakawa
|-
| 2008-02-25
| Punishment Obscene Discipline - Lesbian Torture
| DASDASD-045
| 
| 
|-
| 2008-02-25
| Slave File Vol. 1
| DASDAZD-005
| 
| CompilationWith Maria Ozawa and Reina Matsushima
|-
| 2008-03-25
| Rina Aoki - Black Gang Rape
| DASDASD-048
| Hokusai
| 
|-
| 2008-08-19
| 108 cm Kcup Rin
| OPPAIPPPD-0014
| 
| 
|-
| 2008-09-19
| 108 cm Kcup Rin 110 cm Lcup Yuko
| OPPAIPPSD-006
| 
| Co-starring Yuko Sakurai
|-
| 2008-10-19
| Penis for Life Rin Aoki
| RanmaruTYOD-017
| 
| 
|-
| 2008-11-22
| Largest-ever super-tits gangbang
| OPPAIAVGL-113
| 
| With Chichi Asada, Rui Akikawa & Ryo MomoseEntry in the 2009 AV Grand Prix contest
|-
| 2008-12-07
| Chased Woman| Attackers RyubakuRBD-131
| Katsuyuki Hasegawa
| 
|-
| 2009-01-19
| 108 cm Kcup Paizuri Rin Aoki| OPPAIPPPD-028
| 
| 
|-
| 2009-02-19
| 108 cm Kcup Female Teacher Rin Aoki| OPPAIPPPD-035
| 
| 
|-
| 2009-03-07
| Married Woman Self-Sacrifice Rape| Attackers InmadATID-145
| Kenzo Nagira
| With Riria Himesaki
|-
| 2009-04-19
| 108 cm Kcup Soap Rin Aoki| OPPAIPPPD-049
| 
| 
|-
| 2009-05-19
| 108 cm Kcup OL Rin Aoki| OPPAIPPPD-051
| 
| 
|-
| 2009-06-19
| 108 cm K Cup, 99 cm I Cup, W Big Tits Dream Rin Aoki & Nana Aoyama| OPPAIPPSD-015
| 
| Co-starring Nana Aoyama
|-
| 2009-07-19
| 108 cm Kcup Nurse Rin Aoki| OPPAIPPPD-060
| 
| 
|-
| 2009-08-13
| Super Tits Body Special| Moodyz RealMIRD-066
| Kyosei
| With Meisa Hanai, Ruru Anoa & Hinata Komine
|-
| 2009-09-19
| Fan Thanksgiving Festival Rin Aoki| OPPAIPPPD-070
| 
| 
|-
| 2009-10-19
| Rin Aoki Lustful Body| RookieRKI-042
| Kyosei
| 
|-
| 2009-11-07
| Intensely Exhausted Bursting Tits Wife's Routine Indecency - Zealous Yoga Instructor Somewhat Plump Madame, Rin's Affair| Madonna FitchJUFD-083
| Tairyo Hata
| 
|-
| 2009-11-13
| My Loving Teacher Rin| Moodyz DivaMIDD-561
| H.HANAKI
| 
|-
| 2010-03-19
| Rin Aoki In Soap Land| Crystal-Eizou e-KissEKDV-087
| Yukihiko Shimamura
| 
|-
| 2010-04-16
| Document Red Edition DX Hypnosis 30| AudazAD-189
| Rusher Miyoshi
| 
|-
| 2010-04-16
| Document Red Edition DX Hypnosis 30 Super Mind Control| AudazAD-190
| Rusher Miyoshi
| 
|-
| 2010-04-23
| Non Stop Orgasm - Portio Endorphin| Crystal-Eizou e-KissEKDV-092
| Meo Sakamoto
| 
|-
| 2010-08-13
| Brush Down Losing One's Virginity| Crystal-Eizou e-KissEKDV-115
| 
| 
|}

Photobooks
 Rin's I Land — (AquaHouse) — March 2003
 Eat Me — (Saibunkan) — June 2005
 Pineapple'' (パイナポ) — (Saibunkan) — May 2006

Notes

Sources

 
 
 

Living people
1985 births
Japanese pornographic film actresses
Japanese gravure models
Japanese female erotic dancers
People from Yamagata Prefecture